St. Agnes Cemetery is a  Roman Catholic cemetery established in 1867. Located in Menands, New York, St. Agnes Cemetery is managed and cared for by Albany Diocesan Cemeteries.

St. Agnes Cemetery was consecrated in 1867 and has features characteristic of the rural cemetery movement. Like other landscapes of this genre, St. Agnes Cemetery was designed to portray order, symmetry, and peace. The history of the Capital Region is written on memorials throughout St. Agnes Cemetery.

It was listed on the National Register of Historic Places in 2008.

Notable interments
 Anthony N. Brady, businessman
 Parker Dunn, Medal of Honor recipient
 Matty Fitzgerald, baseball player
 Martin Henry Glynn, Congressman, Governor of New York from 1913 to 1914
 John C. Heenan, Prize fighter
 Jack Joyce, Wild West performer and horse trainer
 Nicholas Thomas Kane, Congressman
 Mary Nash, actress
 Michael Nicholas Nolan, Congressman
 Leo William O'Brien, Congressman
 Terence J. Quinn, Congressman
 Artur Rodziński, conductor
 Charles Tracey, Congressman
 Anthony Ulasewicz, Watergate scandal figure
 Robert G. Vignola, actor and director
 Patrick H. White, Medal of Honor recipient

References

External links
 Albany Diocesan Cemeteries of the Roman Catholic Diocese of Albany in New York website
 

Cemeteries on the National Register of Historic Places in New York (state)
1867 establishments in New York (state)
Roman Catholic cemeteries in New York (state)
Cemeteries in Albany County, New York
National Register of Historic Places in Albany County, New York